The 2007 Golden League was the tenth edition of the IAAF's annual series of six athletics meets, held across Europe, with athletes having the chance to win the Golden League Jackpot of $1 million.

Jackpot events

 Men
 100 m
 1500 m / Mile
 110 m hurdles
 Triple Jump
 Javelin throw
 Women
 100 m
 400 m
 100 m hurdles
 High Jump
 Pole Vault

The 2007 series included meets at

 Oslo, Norway (Bislett Games) on June 15.
 Paris, France (Meeting Gaz de France) on July 6.
 Rome, Italy (Golden Gala) on July 13.
 Zürich, Switzerland (Weltklasse Zürich) on September 7.
 Brussels, Belgium (Memorial Van Damme) on September 14.
 Berlin, Germany (ISTAF) on September 16.

Bislett Games 

Held in Oslo, Norway on June 15, at the Bislett Stadium. Meseret Defar's Women's 5000 m World Record somewhat overshadowed the Jackpot events in Oslo, but some interesting Jackpot contenders emerged.

Men's 100 m 

World Record-holder, Asafa Powell, took the event in 9.94.

Wind: +0.9 m/s

Men's 1500 m 

(Held as Mile) Moroccan Adil Kaouch produced a personal best to win this event from Augustine Choge of Kenya and Andrew Baddeley of Great Britain. Australian Craig Mottram finished ninth.

Men's 110 m Hurdles 

USA's Anwar Moore took a narrow victory in the absence of World Record-holder Liu Xiang, Cuban Dayron Robles, and top Americans such as Terrence Trammell and Dominique Arnold.

Wind: -0.3 m/s

Men's Triple Jump 

Great Britain's Phillips Idowu took a surprise victory from Olympic and European champion Christian Olsson and World Leader Jadel Gregório.

Men's Javelin 

Finn Tero Pitkämäki out-threw Olympic champion and home crowd favorite Andreas Thorkildsen, and in-form American Breaux Greer.

Women's 100 m 

American Stephanie Durst continued her good form to take victory ahead of Sheri-Ann Brooks.

Wind: -0.2 m/s

Women's 400 m 

Sanya Richards took an expected victory from former World Champion Amy Mbacke Thiam of Senegal.

Women's 100 m Hurdles 

World Champion Michelle Perry extended her winning streak to 14 races, beating top European Susanna Kallur.

 Wind: -0.1m/s

Women's High Jump 

Olympic and World Indoor Champion, Yelena Slesarenko, beat a star-studded field which included the European Champion indoors and outdoors, Tia Hellebaut, World Champion outdoors and World Record-holder indoors, Kajsa Bergqvist, and four other jumpers who had been over 2 meters this year.

Women's Pole Vault 

Olympic, World, and European Champion, Yelena Isinbayeva, who also holds both the indoor and outdoor World Records, took a highly anticipated victory ahead of Polish rival Monika Pyrek.

Jackpot Contenders

Men
100 m: Asafa Powell

1500 m: Adil Kaouch

110 m Hurdles: Anwar Moore

Triple Jump: Phillips Idowu

Javelin: Tero Pitkämäki

Women 

100 m: Stephanie Durst

400 m: Sanya Richards

100 m Hurdles: Michelle Perry

High Jump: Yelena Slesarenko

Pole Vault: Yelena Isinbayeva

Meeting Gaz de France 

Held in Paris, France, at the nine-lane track of the Stade de France, on July 6.

Men's 100 m 

Asafa Powell (winner in Oslo), battling with injury, did not run in Paris, and so was out of the Jackpot race before it had started. In his absence, Bahamian, Derrick Atkins, won in 10.00 seconds.

 Wind: -0.1 m/s

Men's 1500 m 

Adil Kaouch, winner in Oslo, was also injured and out of the Jackpot race, but a thrilling race ensued, with Alan Webb's sprint for home beating the valiant efforts of home-crowd favorite Mehdi Baala.

Men's 110 m Hurdles 

Olympic Champion Liu Xiang and World Champion Ladji Doucouré were in Paris to outrun Oslo winner Anwar Moore, but it was only the young Cuban Dayron Robles who could out-dip the American this occasion, as the two were awarded the same time, 13.13.

 Wind: +0.5 m/s

Men's Triple Jump 

Again, the Oslo winner, Phillips Idowu, was injured and out of the Jackpot race, but Christian Olsson made up for his disappointment at the Bislett Games, by winning with 17.56.

Men's Javelin 

Tero Pitkämäki was the only male winner from Oslo to win in Paris, doing so in a European Lead of 89.70. Three of his five valid throws would have been enough to win as he produced a peerless series of throw, ahead of rival Andreas Thorkildsen.

Women's 100 m 

Stephanie Durst did not venture to Paris and was out of the jackpot race. Torri Edwards won in a race with Americans occupying the top four places.

 Wind: +0.5 m/s

Women's 400 m 

Sanya Richards produced a World Lead to win, in a race which included all three women who out-did her for a place on the USA's World Championships team.

Women's 100 m hurdles 

Michelle Perry was one of the lucky few to repeat her Oslo win, convincingly outrunning Susanna Kallur, again, remaining in the hunt for the Jackpot.

 Wind: -0.2 m/s

Women's High Jump 

Oslo winner Yelena Slesarenko could only manage a second-place finish as Blanka Vlašić impressed with 2.02 meters, with both women jumping 2 or more meters.

Women's Pole Vault 

Yelena Isinbayeva regained exciting form as she sailed over 4.91 m, which she followed with the attempts at a would-be World Record of 5.02. European Indoor Champion, Svetlana Feofanova returned to heights not seen, from her, this season, as she finished second with 4.71.

Jackpot Contenders 

With three Oslo winners injured and two choosing not to compete in Paris, only six athletes were still in the Jackpot race before the Meeting Gaz de France had begun. Two of those six finished second in their respective events, and only four remain in contention after Paris.

Men 

Javelin: Tero Pitkämäki

Women 

400 m: Sanya Richards
100 m Hurdles: Michelle Perry
Pole Vault: Yelena Isinbayeva

Golden Gala 

The third stop of the Golden League took place at Rome's Stadio Olimpico, on June 13, 2007.
This meet hit headlines, as French long jumper Salim Sdiri was hit by a rogue javelin, thrown by Finn Tero Pitkämäki, as he warmed up for his event. The injuries sustained, however, were not serious and Sdiri made a full recovery.

Men's 100 m 

Asafa Powell took his second Golden League victory, beating Paris winner Derrick Atkins who took second.

 Wind: +0.5 m/s

Men's 1500 m 

Adil Kaouch also took a second Golden League victory, in a Personal Best, with several other athletes recording the best results of their lives.

Men's 110 m Hurdles 

Oslo winner Anwar Moore won a close-run race from Paris winner Dayron Robles.

Men's Triple Jump 

Christian Olsson only took two attempts before retiring, a foul and a jump which turned out to be a winning mark.

Men's Javelin 

Tero Pitkämäki plummeted out of the jackpot race, as Olympic champion Andreas Thorkildsen took the win. However, this competition was more memorable for a freak accident concerning Pitkämäki and French long jumper Salim Sdiri. On the Finn's second throw, his javelin veered off to the left and into the long jump area, where Sdiri was warming up. The implement hit Sdiri in his side but no serious injuries were sustained. The incident clearly had an adverse effect on Pitkämäki, however, as he failed to match his first round effort of 86.09 m.

Women's 100 m 

Torri Edwards continued her fine season with a win over compatriot Me'Lisa Barber and top European Tezzhan Naimova, as Allyson Felix finished fourth.

Women's 400 m 

Sanya Richards remained in the jackpot hunt with a graceful performance ahead of 2001 World champion Amy Mbackie Thiam, who set her fastest time for four years.

Women's 100 m Hurdles 

Michelle Perry set a world lead to win, as Susanna Kallur was disappointed to finish third.

Women's High Jump 

Blanka Vlašić took her second Golden League win of the season, as two athletes went over 2 m. Antonietta Di Martino, who had hoped to perform well in front of her home crowd, disappointed, finishing fourth.

Women's Pole Vault 

Yelena Isinbayeva took a clear victory to keep her hopes of a jackpot share alive. Isinbayeva missed her first attempt at 4.65 m, then passed to 4.70, which she cleared first time, then came a failure at 4.85, attempts were passed to 4.90, which was routinely cleared at the first attempt. None of the three world record attempts at 5.02 m were close.

Jackpot contenders 
Tero Pitkämäki was the only casualty of the meeting, as three women remained in the jackpot hunt.

Women 
400 m: Sanya Richards, 100 m Hurdles: Michelle Perry, Pole Vault: Yelena Isinbayeva

Weltklasse Zürich 

Held in Zürich, Switzerland, at the Letzigrund stadium, on September 7.

Men's 100 m 

Wind: +0.1 m/s

Men's 1500 m

Men's 110 m Hurdles 

Wind: -0.2 m/s

Men's Triple Jump

Men's Javelin

Women's 100 m 

Wind: -0.1 m/s

Women's 400 m

Women's 100 m Hurdles

Women's High Jump

Women's Pole Vault

Jackpot Contenders

Women 

400 m: Sanya Richards, Pole Vault: Yelena Isinbayeva

Memorial Van Damme 
The 31st edition of the Memorial Van Damme took place at the King Baudouin Stadium, in Brussels, Belgium, on 14 September 2007.

The Golden League events were somewhat overshadowed in Brussels, as Meseret Defar succeeded in her world record attempt in the two miles event and Kenenisa Bekele failed in his attempt over 10,000 m.

Men's 100 m 

Wind: -0.3

Men's 200 m 

Wind: +0.7

Men's 800 m

Men's 1500 m

Men's 5,000 m

Men's 10,000 m 

Kenenisa Bekele, the current world record holder, won but failed to make a new world record in this event.

Men's 3,000 m Steeplechase 

Koech won with a new world lead for this year, and an improvement of 0.62 seconds to the previous lead, that marked in Stockholm in August.

Men's 110 m Hurdles 

Wind: -0.5

Men's Triple Jump

Men's Javelin Throw

Women's 100 m 

Wind: ±0.0

Women's 200 m 

Wind: +0.5

Women's 400 m

Women's One Mile

Women's 3,000 m

Women's Two Miles 

After her 5,000 m event gold medal at the world champs this year, Defar successes to make a new world record in this event - with an improvement of 11.89 seconds to the previous record.

Women's 100 m Hurdles 

Wind: +0.5

Women's High Jump

Women's Pole Vault

Jackpot Contenders

Women 

400 m: Sanya Richards, Pole Vault: Yelena Isinbayeva

ISTAF 
The 15th edition of the Internationales Stadionfest (ISTAF) took place at the Berlin Olympiastadion, in Berlin, Germany, on 16 September 2007.

Men's 100 m 

Wind: -0.5

Men's 200 m 

Wind: -0.8

Men's 400 m

Men's 1500 m

Men's 110 m Hurdles 

Wind: -0.5

Men's 400 m Hurdles

Men's Pole Vault

Men's Triple Jump

Men's Javelin Throw

Women's 100 m 

Wind: -0.3 m/s

Women's 200 m 

The American female sprinter Lauryn Williams won this event with a time of 22.95.

Wind: -0.3 m/s

Women's 400 m

Women's 800 m

Women's 5,000 m

Women's 100 m Hurdles 

The Sweden female athlete Susanna Kallur beat the American world champion Michelle Perry with a time of 12.49, very close to Perry's world lead for this year, 12.44.

 Wind: +0.9m/s

Women's High Jump 

Blanka Vlašić, the  Croatian world champion for this event this year, won the event with a good high of 2.00 m.

Women's Pole Vault 

Olympic, World, and European Champion, Yelena Isinbayeva, completed her 6 wins in 2007 Golden League in this meet.

Women's Javelin Throw

Jackpot Winners

Yelena Isinbaeva from Russia, in the women's Pole Vault event; and Sanya Richards from United States, in the women's 400 m event. Each of them got a prize of $500,000.

External links 
 IAAF report of 'Bislett Games'
 IAAF report of 'Meeting Gaz de France'
 IAAF report of 'Golden Gala'
 IAAF report of 'Weltklasse Zürich'
 IAAF report of 'Memorial van Damme'
 IAAF report of 'ISTAF'

IAAF Golden League
IAAF Golden League